"Light of the World" is a song by English singer-songwriter Kim Appleby, released in July 1993 as the first single from her second solo album, Breakaway (1993). Appleby co-wrote it with her producers Neal Slateford and Neil Davidge. It reached number 41 on the UK Singles Chart in July 1993, but was more successful on the UK Dance Singles Chart, peaking at number 15. Additionally, it charted in Germany, peaking at number 58, spending a total of 7 weeks on the German singles chart. Outside Europe, the single reached number 137 in Australia.

Critical reception
Larry Flick from Billboard wrote, "It's a pleasure to hear Kim Appleby back on the boards with "Light Of The World", a rave-etched pop/houser that is ready to dominate peak-hour programs." He added that "Kim romps happily, turning in a vocal that has a lot more soul than in the past." Pan-European magazine Music & Media commented, "Okay, it's bubble gum, but don't call Kim dim. She has grown up with her audience and is therefore still relevant to good pop radio." James Hamilton from the RM Dance Update described it as a "Hi-NRG pop canterer". 

Pete Stanton from Smash Hits gave it four out of five, noting that the singer "marks her return with a lively up-beat pop tune that'll have them singing in the aisles." He added, "This type of song makes you wiggle around the kitchen/lounge/potting shed or wherever you happen to be. The world needs songs like this for when it's sunny outside." In her review of Breakaway, the magazine's Hilary Chapman felt that the song comes close to the "irresistible catchiness" of Appleby's 1990 hit "Don't Worry", adding that the singer "shines in the uptempo songs of hope and optimism".

Music video
A black-and-white music video was produced to promote the single, directed by Tim Royes and Russell Young, and released on 19 July 1993. It was shot on 35mm and made as a stylish close-up performance film."

Track listings
 7-inch single, UK
 "Light of the World" – 4:46
 "Don't Worry" – 3:30

 12-inch single, UK and Europe
 "Light of the World" (Phil Kelsey Remix) – 6:06
 "Light of the World" (Extended Mix) – 7:13
 "Light of the World" (Chaps Remix) – 7:04

 CD single, UK
 "Light of the World" – 4:46
 "Don't Worry" – 3:30
 "Shame" – 4:38
 "Light of the World" – 7:04

Charts

References

1993 singles
1993 songs
Black-and-white music videos
Dance-pop songs
Kim Appleby songs
Parlophone singles